Dibongia is one of the major clans, into which the Deori tribe of India is divided. The other three major clans of are Tengaponiya, Bo-geenya and Pator-goya.

A section of Deori tribe who lived in the bank of the river Dibang, are now known as Dibongia.

Clans